This is a list of mayors (alcaldes) of Cádiz.

Mayors of Cádiz 

Fermín Salvochea 1873-03-22 - 1873
Eduardo Genovés Puig
Miguel de Aguirre y Corveto 1899-07-03 - 1901-12-21
Nicomedes Herrero y López 1901-12-31 - 1903-01-03
Enrique Díaz Rocafull 1903-01-03 - 1905-02-24
José Luis Gómez y de Aramburu 1905-02-24 - 1907-02-20
Cayetano del Toro y Quartiellers 1907-02-20 - 1909-11-17
Francisco Díaz García 1911-09-09 - 1912
Ramón Rivas y Valladares 1912 - 1915-12-31
Sebastián Martínez de Pinillos y Tourne 1915-12-31 - 1917-07-04
Manuel García Noguerol 1917-07-04 - 1917-12-01
Francisco Clotet y Miranda 1917-12-01 - 1920-04-09
Manuel García Noguerol 1920-04-09 - 1920-04-21
Arturo Gallego y Martínez 1920-04-21 - 1922-12-20
Francisco Clotet y Miranda 1922-12-20 - 1923-10-05
Manuel García Noguerol 1923-10-05 - 1925
Agustín Blázquez y Paúl 1925 - 1927
Ramón de Carranza y Fernández de la Reguera 1927-07-15 - 1931-04-14
Emilio de Sola Ramons 1931-08-05 - 1933
Manuel de la Pinta Leal 1933 - 1935
Joaquín Fernández-Repeto 1935 - 1936
Manuel de la Pinta Leal 1936-02-20 - 1936-07-18
Eduardo Aranda Asquerino 1936-07-19 - 1936-07-28
Ramón de Carranza y Fernández de la Reguera 1936-07-28 - 1936-09-13
Juan de Dios Molina y Arroquia 1937-08-02 - 1940-06-28
Pedro Barbadillo Delgado 1940-06-28 - 1941-11-14
Fernando de Arbazuza y Oliva 1941-11-14 - 1942-02-07
Alfonso Moreno Gallardo 1942-02-11 - 1947-03-20
Francisco Sánchez Cossío 1947-03-20 - 1948-02-06
José León de Carranza Gómez-Pablos 1948-02-08 - 1969-05-23
Jerónimo Almagro y Montes de Oca 1969-06-25 - 1976-01-15
Emilio Beltrami López-Linares 1976-02-01 - 1979-04-19
Carlos Díaz Medina 1979-04-19 - 1995-06-18
Teófila Martínez 1995-06-18 - 2015-06-13
José María González Santos 2015-06-13 - present

See also
 Timeline of Cádiz

Cádiz
Cadiz